Sagittaria guayanensis, the Guyanese arrowhead, is an aquatic plant species. It is predominantly tropical, native to Mexico, Central America, the West Indies, and much of South America, as well as West Africa (from Senegal to Cameroon), south and southeast Asia (from Afghanistan to Taiwan to Indonesia), plus Sudan and Madagascar. It was unknown in the United States until a few populations were reported from Louisiana in 1969.

The epithet has incorrectly been spelled "guyanensis" by some authors. Type locale is not Guyana but rather in the Guayana region in what is now eastern Venezuela, regarded as part of Colombia when the specimen was collected.

Sagittaria guayanensis is a perennial herb with broadly hastate (arrow-shaped) leaves with ovate lobes.

References

External links
photo of herbarium specimen at Missouri Botanical Garden, Sagittaria guayanensis collected in Nicaragua
Flora of Pakistan Sagittaria guayanensis
Especies disponsibles de Costa Rica, Sagittaria guayanensis 
West African Plants, a photo guide, Sagittaria guayanensis 
Plantes des Rizieres de Guyane, Cirad, Sagittaria guayanensis 

guayanensis
Flora of Mexico
Flora of South America
Flora of West Tropical Africa
Flora of Sudan
Flora of Madagascar
Flora of China
Flora of Afghanistan
Flora of tropical Asia
Plants described in 1816